Into the Unknown is the fifth album by Danish heavy metal band Mercyful Fate, released by Metal Blade Records in 1996. It is the most commercially successful Mercyful Fate album to date, peaking at No. 31 in the Finnish charts and remaining for two weeks in the Top 40. It is the only album by the band to appear on the charts.

Track listing

Personnel 
Mercyful Fate
King Diamond – vocals, keyboards, producer, mixing
Hank Shermann – guitars, mixing
Michael Denner – guitars
Sharlee D'Angelo – bass
Bjarne T. Holm – drums

Production
Tim Kimsey – producer, engineer, mixing
Troy Scheer – assistant engineer
Howie Weinberg – mastering at Masterdisk, New York
Brian Slagel – executive producer

References 

Into the Unknown
1996 albums
Metal Blade Records albums
Cthulhu Mythos music